The murder of Katarzyna Zowada occurred at the end of 1998 in Kraków, Poland. The victim was a 23-year-old female student, who was attending Jagiellonian University.

Investigators and experts from other countries were called to assist in solving the crime, including the FBI. Police made the first arrest in 2017, 19 years later, after discovering new evidence. As of September 2019, the suspect remains in custody while investigators continue to gather evidence.

Disappearance and discovery of remains 
In 1998, Katarzyna Zowada (1 June 1975 - c. 7-14 December 1998) began studying religion at Jagiellonian University, located in nearby Kraków. According to friends, she was a nice, although "sad and withdrawn" person. She had suffered from depression since the death of her father in 1996. During her time at the university, she changed her field of study twice. After her first semester as a psychology student, she briefly attended a history course before settling on religious studies.

On 12 November 1998, Katarzyna was due to meet her mother at the Psychiatric Clinic in Nowa Huta, where she had been treated for her depression. She never made it to the appointment. Later that day, Katarzyna's mother attempted to file a missing person's report at the local police station, but was told to wait.

On 6 January 1999, while on the Vistula, the crew of the Elk pusher tug  found a piece of evidence  on the ship. After examination, it was discovered to be human skin. DNA tests indicated it belonged to Katarzyna. On 14 January, Katarzyna's right leg was also recovered from the river.
Initially, it was assumed that the body had been destroyed by a propeller; however, when examining the body fragments found, it was found that the skin was removed from the torso on purpose and the limbs and head were cut off. The skin was prepared in such a way as to create a kind of bodysuit that the murderer was probably wearing.

Investigation 
In May 1999, the Forensic Medicine Unit in Kraków received a corpse of a man with a severed and scalped head. The killer, Vladimir W., turned out to be the son of the victim, originally from the Caucasus. Prior to the arrest, he was seen in a mask made of skin pulled from the head of his own father. Initially, investigators suspected that Vladimir committed Katarzyna's murder. However, no evidence was found to support it. He was later charged with his father's murder and sentenced to 25 years in prison. After a few years, he was transferred to a prison in Russia at his own request.

A year later, the investigation was formally dropped because the perpetrator had not been discovered, but police officers involved in the case continued investigating credible leads.

In 2012, thanks to advances in the field of forensic research and cooperation with experts, the prosecutor's office resumed the investigation. A team of police officers from the "X-Files" (cold case unit) was brought in. The exhumation and additional autopsy of Katarzyna's remains were ordered.

Experts from the 3D Expertise Laboratory of the Wrocław Medical University created a model of injuries inflicted on the victim. They concluded that the attacker had used a sharp tool to wound his victim on her neck, armpit and groin, to inflict pain and cause her to bleed to death.

In 2014, an FBI representative for Europe created a psychological profile of the suspect, pointing to his sadistic tendencies.

In 2016, investigators consulted with University of Coimbra professor Duarte Nuno Vieira, a Portuguese specialist in forensics and UN expert in the field of signs of torture on the human body. He confirmed that Katarzyna was tortured before her death and that the perpetrator was probably trained in martial arts, specifically one particular, undisclosed variation.

The arrest of the suspect 
On 4 October 2017, 19 years after the murder, police arrested 52-year old Robert Janczewski in Kraków's Kazimierz district. Investigators searched his apartment and found blood in the bathroom. As a result, the bath and frame were secured for further testing. He was a person of interest in 1999 but had not been arrested.

Janczewski fit the psychological profile as he was trained in martial arts, knew the victim, visited the victim's grave and had a history of harassing women. He had previously worked in a dissecting lab, where he dealt with human corpses. He also worked at the Cracow Institute of Zoology, where he could observe the process of preparing animal skins. His employment was terminated the day after he killed all of the institute's rabbits during his shift. Janczewski couldn't explain his actions.

The police detained him after a letter from the suspect's friend. The contents of the letter are a closely guarded secret of the investigation.

Janczewski was charged with aggravated murder with particular cruelty. He maintains that he did not know Katarzyna Zowada.

The Court of Appeal agreed to extend his detention until 6 September 2018 while investigators gathered evidence. In December Janczewski complained of harassment from the prison guards. The claims were investigated and found to be groundless.

As of September 2019, Janczewski has not yet been released. Investigators requested a closed trial.

See also
List of solved missing person cases
List of unsolved  murders

References 

1990s missing person cases
1998 murders in Poland 
1999 murders in Poland 
Female murder victims
Missing person cases in Poland
Murder in Poland
Unsolved murders in Poland
Violence against women in Poland